Puerto Rico Highway 112 (PR-112) is a rural road that travels from Isabela, Puerto Rico to Moca. It begins at its intersection with PR-113 in downtown Isabela and ends at its junction with PR-125 in eastern Moca.

Major intersections

See also

 List of highways numbered 112

References

External links
 

112